Polkowice  is a town in south-western Poland. It is situated in Lower Silesian Voivodeship. The town is the seat of Polkowice County and of Gmina Polkowice.

Geography

Situated in a traditional mining region, the town is part of the largest industrial copper-extraction area in Poland, with a copper-processing plant operating nearby. Nearby Polkowice Dolne is the site of a former State Agricultural Farm (PGR) and, since 1998, of a Volkswagen diesel engine plant, another major employer in the region.

Designated as an urban-type settlement from 1945, Polkowice regained town status in 1967. In 1975–1998 it was in the former Legnica Voivodeship.

History

The name of the town is probably derived from Slavic (Old Polish) Boleslaw, meaning "great glory", a favoured dynastic name in the Polish royal House of Piast. According to legend, The Silesian duke Bolesław I the Tall (1127–1201) had a hunting lodge erected near the later town, later called Bolkewice or, adjusted to the German pronunciation, Polkovicz (1333). In the Statuta synodalia episcoporum Wratislaviensium from 1475 the town is named Polkewicze and Polkowice. As a result of the fragmentation of Poland into smaller duchies, it became part of the Duchy of Silesia, and later on the Duchy of Głogów. Polkowice was mentioned as a town (civitas) in a 1276 deed. It remained part of the Duchy of Głogów, ruled by the Polish houses of Piast and Jagiellon, including future Polish kings John I Albert and Sigismund I the Old, until the duchy's dissolution in 1506, when it was incorporated into the Bohemian (Czech) Kingdom.

Parts of the medieval town were destroyed by a blaze in 1457, it suffered further damages during the Thirty Years' War and by a plague epidemic in 1680. After the First Silesian War in 1742, it was annexed by Prussia and later incorporated into the Province of Silesia. During the Napoleonic Wars, the town was visited by Napoleon twice, in 1807 and 1812. Between 1871 and 1945 the town was part of Germany and was renamed Heerwegen in 1937 by German Nazi authorities during a campaign of erasing placenames of Polish origin. During World War II, a German forced labour subcamp of the prison in Jawor was operated in the present-day district of Polkowice Dolne. On January 11, 1945, the German administration evacuated the population, leaving only the army in the town. On February 9, 1945, the town was captured by the Red Army. Afterwards the abandoned town became again part of Poland in accordance to the Potsdam Agreement and was repopulated by Poles, many displaced from former eastern Poland annexed by the Soviet Union.

In 2005 the neighbouring village of Polkowice Dolne was included within the town limits.

Education
 Lower Silesian College of Enterprise and Technology (Dolnośląska Wyższa Szkoła Przedsiębiorczości i Techniki)

Sport
 Górnik Polkowice – football team, playing in the Polish third division. The team played in the country's top flight in season 2003-2004
 MKS Polkowice – women's basketball team, 3rd place in Sharp Torell Basket Liga in 2004/2005 season
 CCC Polsat Polkowice – Road Cycling Team UCI Professional Continental team

Twin towns – sister cities
See twin towns of Gmina Polkowice

Notable residents
 Fritz Thiel (1916-1943), German resistance fighter
 Hans Kratzert (born 1940), German screenwriter and film director

Gallery

References

Cities and towns in Lower Silesian Voivodeship
Polkowice County